Ethminolia gravieri is a species of sea snail, a marine gastropod mollusk in the family Trochidae, the top snails.

Description
The size of the shell attains 1.25 mm.

Distribution
This marine species occurs in the following locations:
 off Madagascar in the Mozambique Channel.

References

 Lamy, Ed., 1910. Coquilles marines recueillies par M. F. Geay à Madagascar. Mémoires de la Société Zoologique de France 22(3-4)"1909": 299-346

External links
 To World Register of Marine Species
 Lamy E. (1909). Diagnoses de coquilles nouvelles recueillies par M. F. Geay à Madagascar (1905). Bulletin du Muséum National d'Histoire Naturelle. 15(6): 368-370.

gravieri
Gastropods described in 1909